The 2022–23 Dartmouth Big Green men's basketball team represented Dartmouth College in the 2022–23 NCAA Division I men's basketball season. The Big Green, led by sixth-year head coach David McLaughlin, played their home games at Leede Arena in Hanover, New Hampshire as members of the Ivy League.

Previous season
The Big Green finished the 2021–22 season 9–16, 6–8 in Ivy League play to finish in fifth place. Since only the top four teams qualify for the Ivy League tournament, they failed to qualify.

Roster

Schedule and results

|-
!colspan=12 style=| Non-conference regular season

|-
!colspan=12 style=| Ivy League regular season

Sources

References

Dartmouth Big Green men's basketball seasons
Dartmouth Big Green
Dartmouth Big Green men's basketball
Dartmouth Big Green men's basketball